One (stylized as one) is a German free-to-air television channel owned and operated by the German public-broadcasting consortium ARD. Managed since October 2005 by Westdeutscher Rundfunk on behalf of ARD as a whole, the channel was originally launched (as EinsFestival) on 30 August 1997.

History
On 29 July 2016, WDR announced that from early September 2016 Einsfestival would be rebranded as One and become a channel specifically aimed at viewers aged between 30 and 49. The channel's website, Twitter, and Facebook presences were updated on 1 September 2016, and the on-air rebrand took effect on 3 September 2016, starting with adoption of the new screen identification at 0.00 and ending with the final adjustment of all aspects of the channel's visual design at 10.00.

The rebrand was aimed at increasing awareness of the station as an entertainment channel, particularly among viewers under 30.

On 15 November 2022, One closed its SDTV feed across its cable and satellite feeds, but the SD feed can still be received using an antenna.

Content
One concentrates on entertainment, and the channel's content is very largely made up of repeat broadcasts of programmes already shown on other ARD channels, national and regional: this includes cinema and television films, drama series, documentaries, reports, magazines, and music programmes (especially rock and pop).

Since the 2004 Summer Olympics ARD and ZDF have used their digital television channels (respectively, One and ZDFneo) to broadcast additional coverage of such sporting events as the Olympic Games and the UEFA European Football Championship. For example, during UEFA Euro 2008 and the 2010 FIFA World Cup these digital channels were used to provide coverage of different matches taking place simultaneously.

One also carries the semi-finals of the Eurovision Song Contest, as well as the final (which is also broadcast by ARD's principal channel, Das Erste).

alfredissimo! (2017–present)
Altes Geld (2017)
Aus heiterem Himmel (2017–present)
Bis in die Spitzen, German version of Cutting It (2011-2012, 2015)
Bernard (2009-2010)
Bobobobs (Die Bobobobs) (1997-2009)Boulevard Bio (2005-2007)Boj (Upcoming in 2021)
Buffy the Vampire Slayer (Buffy – Im Bann der Dämonen) (2010-2011)
Class (2017–present)
Cleverman (2017–present)
Clipster (2012-2013)
coldmirror (2010–2016)
Come Fly with Me (2017–present)
Das Lachen der anderen (2015-2016)
Dawson's Creek (2017–present)
Die Story im Ersten (2010–present)
Die Wiwaldi-Show (2012, 2015)
Dittsche (2005–present)
Doctor Doctor (The Heart Guy) (2018–present)
Doctor Who (2016–present)
Domian (2006-2009)
Earth 2 (2009)
Echo Music Prize (2009-2016)
EINSWEITER (2008-2015)
euromaxx (2010–present)
Eurovision Song Contest (2006-2008, 2010–present)
Fawlty Towers (2010-2011)
Frikjent (Lifjord - Der Freispruch) (2017–present)
extra 3 (2006–present)
frauTV (2013, 2015–present)
Graf Yoster (2004)
Hier und heute (2015-2017)
In aller Freundschaft (2003-2005)
In the Club (In the Club - Schwanger und was dann?) (2016–present)
Inas Nacht (2008–present)
Ladies Night (2007–present)
Les Petits Meurtres d'Agatha Christie (Agatha Christie: Mörderische Spiele) (2017–present)
Little Britain (2016–present)
Lindenstraße (2001–present)
Love, Nina (2017–present)
mannTV (2016)
Meuchelbeck (2015)
Miss Fisher's Murder Mysteries (Miss Fishers mysteriöse Mordfälle) (2016-2017)
Mord mit Aussicht (2013–present)
Murder, She Wrote (Mord ist ihr Hobby) (2012-2013)
NightWash (2006-2007, 2009–present)
Nuhr im Ersten (2009–present)
Nurse Jackie (2016–present)
Polizeiinspektion 1 (2004)
Polizeiruf 110 (2001–present)
PussyTerror TV (2015–present)
Quarks & Caspers (2010–present)
Quarks & Co. (2008–present)
Salto Mortale (2004-2005, 2007-2008, 2017)
Sensitive Skin (2017–present)
Shaun the Sheep (Shaun das Schaf) (2008-2016)
Shuffle (2016–present)
Sturm der Liebe (2011–present)
Tatort (2006–present)
Top of the Pops: 1970sThe Game (2015)The IT Crowd (2017–present)The Job Lot (2017–present)The Tonight Show Starring Jimmy Fallon (2016–2017)Threesome (2018)Torchwood (2017–present)Türkisch für Anfänger (2006–present)twentysomething (2013, 2016–present)Verbotene Liebe (2011-2013)Vorstadtweiber (2015–present)Uncle (2017–present)Zapp (2005-2008, 2011–2019)Zimmer frei! (2006-2009, 2011-2016)Zwei am großen See'' (2009, 2011, 2017)

Broadcasting
SD broadcasting via satellite (Astra 19.2) stopped on 12 January 2021.

High-definition feeds
From 21 to 24 March 2008 Einsfestival ran HDTV test broadcasts via satellite and digital cable (exclusively on Kabel BW). The first HD transmissiones came from the Internationale Funkausstellung Berlin. Between 22 December 2008 and 1 January 2009 Einsfestival again aired HD test shows. SD feed is due to end on 15 November 2022, with One HD remaining.

Channel logos

Audience share

Germany

References

External links

One website

Westdeutscher Rundfunk
ARD (broadcaster)
Television stations in Germany
Television channels and stations established in 1997
German-language television stations